Alternate Olympics, Alternative Olympics, and similar may refer to:

 Interwar left-wing events:
 International Workers' Olympiads, 1925–37
 Spartakiad, 1928–37
 People's Olympiad, planned for Barcelona in 1936
 GANEFO set up by Indonesia in 1963
 As part of the 1980 Olympic boycott:
 Liberty Bell Classic in track and field athletics
 USGF International Invitational 1980 in gymnastics
 International Festivals 1980 (Equestrianism) in dressage, show jumping and military
 Friendship Games, as part of the 1984 Olympic boycott

See also
 List of multi-sport events
 Parallel Olympics or Paralympics for disabled athletes
 Special Olympics for learning-disabled athletes
 World Games for non-Olympic sports
 Deaflympics